Pacy-sur-Eure (literally Pacy on Eure) is a commune in the Eure department, Normandy, France. On 1 January 2017, the former commune of Saint-Aquilin-de-Pacy was merged into Pacy-sur-Eure.

Population

See also
Communes of the Eure department

References

External links

Gazetteer Entry

Communes of Eure